Azazel: Book of Angels Volume 2 is an album by the Masada String Trio performing compositions from John Zorn's second Masada book, "The Book of Angels".

Reception
The Allmusic review awarded the album 3½ stars.

Track listing 
All compositions by John Zorn.
 "Tufiel" - 6:22
 "Mibi" - 1:53
 "Tabaet" - 6:46
 "Symnay" - 5:23
 "Mastema" - 6:39
 "Bethor" - 5:25
 "Uriel" - 4:37
 "Gurid" - 1:52
 "Gazriel" - 4:04
 "Azazel" - 5:26
 "Rsassiel" - 2"38 - misspelled as "Rssasiel" on album sleeve 
 "Garzanal" - 5:21
 "Ahiel" - 3:47
Recorded at Pilot Recording in New York City on June 14, 2005

Personnel 
 Greg Cohen – bass 
 Mark Feldman – violin 
 Erik Friedlander – cello 
 John Zorn – conductor

References 

2005 albums
Albums produced by John Zorn
Book of Angels albums
Tzadik Records albums
Masada String Trio albums